George Charles Hughley (June 26, 1939 – February 27, 1999) was an American football fullback who played for the Washington Redskins and the Toronto Argonauts.

Career
After graduating from Santa Monica High School, Hughley played football at Central State College in Oklahoma. He played in the Canadian Football League for the Toronto Argonauts in 1964. He played in the National Football League (NFL) for the Washington Redskins in 1965. He rushed the ball 37 times for 175 yards and no touchdowns that season; he also caught nine passes for 93 yards and one touchdown.

Death
By 1999, Hughley was a 20-year police department veteran from San Fernando, California. He was riding his motorcycle when he was struck from the rear by a car on the Foothill Freeway near Angeles Crest Highway.  Hughley was on loan to a Southern California drug task force assigned to investigating major drug traffickers.  He was taken by helicopter to Huntington Hospital in Pasadena, California, but he died more than two hours later.

References

External links
 Amer-I-Can Remembrance Article

1939 births
1999 deaths
Players of American football from Los Angeles
American football fullbacks
Washington Redskins players
Central Oklahoma Bronchos football players